The 2019–20 Austrian Football Second League  is the 46th season of the Austrian second-level football league and the second one as the Second League. The league contains 16 teams with one team being promoted to the Austrian Football Bundesliga and 3 teams being relegated to the Austrian Regionalliga.

Teams
Sixteen teams will participate in the 2019–20 season. Promoted teams are Grazer AK from Austrian Regionalliga Central and FC Dornbirn 1913 from Austrian Regionalliga West. No team gained promotion from Austrian Regionalliga East due to the only team to apply for a licence (SK Rapid Wien II) not attaining the required second place.

The team relegated from the 2018–19 Austrian Football Bundesliga were Wacker Innsbruck.

Personnel and kits

Managerial changes

League table

Season statistics

Top goalscorers

See also
 2019–20 Austrian Football Bundesliga
 2019–20 Austrian Cup

References

External links
 Official website 
 Page on AustriaSoccer.at 

2. Liga (Austria) seasons
2019–20 in Austrian football
Aus